Luc Henri Chevalier (born 1992) is an Australian alpine ski racer.

He competed at the 2015 World Championships in Beaver Creek, USA, in the giant slalom.

References

1992 births
Australian male alpine skiers
Living people